Altcar and Hillhouse was a railway station located on the Southport & Cheshire Lines Extension Railway near Great Altcar, Lancashire, England.

Thereafter, the southern terminus of the LSPJR regular services became Barton (or Downholland as it was occasionally known). The "Altcar Bob" service, introduced in July 1906, was so named because it terminated here until that time. Altcar and Hillhouse was situated on the south side of the B5195 road, near the sewage works.

History
Along with all other stations on the extension line, Altcar and Hillhouse closed on 1 January 1917, as a World War I economy measure.

The station was reopened on 1 April 1919, and continued in use until 7 January 1952, when the SCLER was closed to passengers from Aintree Central to Southport Lord Street. The line remained open for public goods traffic until 7 July 1952 at Southport Lord Street, Birkdale Palace and Altcar & Hillhouse Stations. Public goods facilities were ended at Woodvale, Lydiate and Sefton & Maghull stations on the same date as passenger services (7 January 1952) and there were never any goods facilities at Ainsdale Beach station to begin with. After 7 July 1952, a siding remained open at Altcar & Hillhouse for private goods facilities until May 1960. The very last passenger train to run on the SCLER was a railway enthusiasts 'special' between Aintree and Altcar & Hillhouse railways stations on 6 June 1959.

As an ex Cheshire Lines Committee railway the line through Altcar & Hillhouse became a joint operation between the London, Midland and Scottish Railway and the London and North Eastern Railway following the Grouping of 1923.

The line then passed on to the London Midland Region of British Railways on nationalisation in 1948, before closure by the British Railways Board on 7 July 1952.

The site today
The station has been demolished. The route of the line through the station is today part of the Trans Pennine Trail.

References

Sources

External links
 Altcar and Hillhouse via Disused Stations UK
 Station on a 1948 OS map via npe maps
 The station on an 1888-1913 Overlay OS Map via National Library of Scotland
 Special trains via sixbellsjunction

Railway stations in Great Britain opened in 1884
Railway stations in Great Britain closed in 1917
Railway stations in Great Britain opened in 1919
Railway stations in Great Britain closed in 1952
Former Cheshire Lines Committee stations
Disused railway stations in the Borough of West Lancashire